Jørstad Station is a railway station in the village of Jørstad in the municipality of Snåsa in Trøndelag county, Norway.  The station was opened on 30 October 1926 when this section of the Nordlandsbanen railway line opened.  It was originally just a small stop, but it was upgraded to a full station in 1930.  In 1984, it was reduced to an unstaffed stop once again.

References

Railway stations in Trøndelag
Railway stations on the Nordland Line
Railway stations opened in 1926
1926 establishments in Norway